Wilbur Jackson (born November 19, 1951) is a former American football running back for the San Francisco 49ers of the National Football League (NFL). He was drafted in the first round of the 1974 NFL Draft out of University of Alabama by the 49ers. He played five seasons for San Francisco, and then three years with the Washington Redskins.

Jackson was the first black player to be offered a football scholarship at the University of Alabama and was inducted into the Alabama Sports Hall of Fame in 2007. He owns the Alabama school record for yards per carry (7.2) for his career (1,529 yards on 212 attempts) from 1971–73. Against Virginia Tech in 1973 he rushed for 138 yards on 5 carries, an average of 27.6 yards per carry.

During the Super Bowl XVII highlight film, Jackson can be seen pulling up lame with a hamstring injury after attempting to stop Fulton Walker of the Miami Dolphins from returning a kickoff 98 yards for a touchdown, the first such score in Super Bowl history.

See also
 Alabama Crimson Tide football yearly statistical leaders

References

1951 births
Living people
Alabama Crimson Tide football players
American football running backs
People from Ozark, Alabama
San Francisco 49ers players
Washington Redskins players